Craneco is an unincorporated community in Logan County, West Virginia, United States.

The name Craneco is an amalgamation of Cole and Crane, a business in the lumber industry.

References

Unincorporated communities in Logan County, West Virginia
Unincorporated communities in West Virginia